Malinda Williams (born September 24, 1970) is an American actress and producer. She began her career on television, before appearing in films A Thin Line Between Love and Hate (1996), High School High (1996), and The Wood (1999).

From 2000 to 2004, Williams starred as Tracy "Bird" Van Adams in the Showtime drama series Soul Food, for which she received three NAACP Image Award for Outstanding Actress in a Drama Series nominations. After starring role in the short-lived NBC drama series Windfall, Williams returned to film playing supporting roles in Idlewild (2006), Daddy's Little Girls (2007), First Sunday (2008), and 2 Days in New York (2012).

Career
Williams made her television debut in an episode of The Cosby Show in 1987. She guest starred on Miami Vice, Roc, My So-Called Life, Sister, Sister, Moesha, and NYPD Blue. In film, she made her debut in the 1996 black comedy-romance film A Thin Line Between Love and Hate. Later that year, she co-starred in Sunset Park and High School High. From 1997 to 1998, she had a starring role in The WB sitcom Nick Freno: Licensed Teacher. In 1999, she appeared in the romantic comedy film The Wood and the following year in the thriller Uninvited Guest.

Williams is best known for her role as Bird in the Showtime drama series Soul Food, a continuation of the successful 1997 film of the same name. It also starred Nicole Ari Parker and Vanessa Estelle Williams. For her performance, Williams received three NAACP Image Awards for Outstanding Actress in a Drama Series nominations. The series aired from 2000 to 2004. Soul Food went on to be the longest running drama with a predominantly black cast in the history of American prime-time television.

After Soul Food ended, the same year, Williams appeared rapper Young Buck's music video "Shorty Wanna Ride" playing the rapper's love interest

She later guest-starred on Law & Order: Special Victims Unit, and was a regular cast member on the short-lived NBC drama series Windfall in 2006.
 
In 2006, Williams appeared in the musical film Idlewild. The following year, she co-starred in the Tyler Perry's romantic comedy-drama Daddy's Little Girls. In 2008, she appeared in First Sunday opposite Ice Cube. She then starred in several independent films. In 2012, Williams co-starred as Chris Rock's sister in the romantic comedy film 2 Days in New York. Between 2013 and 2015, she played the leading role in the Up  network's television film Marry Me for Christmas, and its two sequels Marry Us for Christmas and A Baby for Christmas. In 2013, she began hosting the Aspire network's television talk show Exhale. She also starred in two films for TV One: Girlfriends' Getaway and its sequel Girlfriends' Getaway 2 in 2014 and 2015, alongside Garcelle Beauvais, Terri J. Vaughn and Essence Atkins. In 2015, Williams also had a supporting role in David O. Russell's comedy film Accidental Love.

Personal life
Williams was married to actor Mekhi Phifer from 1999-2003; they have son Omikaye.

In August 2008, she married rapper D-Nice; they separated in August 2009 and filed for divorce in February 2010; and it was finalized on June 14, 2010.

Filmography

Film/Movie

Television

Music videos
"Many Styles" by Audio Two
"Someone to Love You" by Ruff Endz
"Back at you" by Mobb Deep
"Shorty Wanna Ride" by Young Buck
"What Could've Been" by Ginuwine
"Until It's Gone" by Monica
"Self Destruction" by Boogie Down Productions

Awards and nominations

References

External links

20th-century American actresses
21st-century American actresses
Actresses from New Jersey
American child actresses
African-American actresses
Place of birth missing (living people)
American film actresses
American television actresses
Living people
Actors from Elizabeth, New Jersey
People from Westfield, New Jersey
1970 births
20th-century African-American women
21st-century African-American women
21st-century African-American people